Women Hold Up Half the Sky is the debut solo studio album by British Jamaican singer Ruby Turner, released in 1986 by Jive Records.

Singles
The album includes five singles which reached the UK Singles Chart: a cover of The Staple Singers song and featuring Jonathan Butler, "If You're Ready (Come Go with Me)" (UK #30), "I'm in Love" (UK #61, #57 re-release), "Bye Baby" (UK #52), a cover of the Etta James standard "I'd Rather Go Blind" (UK #24) and "In My Life" (UK #95).

Track listing

2010 Remastered Edition bonus tracks
"Won't Cry No More"
"I'm Livin' a Life of Love"
"If You're Ready (Come Go with Me)" (Extended Version)
"Ooo Baby Baby"
"In My Life (It's Better to Be in Love)" (Alternative Version)

Chart performance

References

External links

1986 debut albums
Ruby Turner albums
Jive Records albums
Cherry Red Records albums